Malin Kundang is a popular folktale in Indonesian folklore that originated in the province of West Sumatra. The folktale tells of an ungrateful son named Malin Kundang and centers around the themes of disobedience and retribution that turned him into stone. There are several other similar variations across South East Asia including Si Tanggang and Nakhoda Manis that originated in Malaysia and Brunei.

History 
The legend of Malin Kundang stems from the people of Minangkabau located in the highlands West Sumatra, Indonesia. Minangkabau is the largest ethnic group on the island that is home to many cultural folktales, with Malin Kundang being one of them. Aside from the famous folktale, other legends that originated from the Minangkabau people includes The Legend of the White Siamang and The Janiah River Magic Fish. These stories are passed down from generations to generations and continue to exist through orality. 

In Minangkabau culture, the socio-cultural values and beliefs that are used as a guideline for the community is called local wisdom. These values comes in a variety of forms including folktales, songs, and performances. The story incorporates traditional values that the people of Minangkabau uphold, making the story an integral part of Minangkabau folktale and contributing to its culture. The moral lessons and deeper interpretation of Malin Kundang is a reflection of the values in Minangkabau's previous and current society. It is a way of preserving their tradition and promoting these values to the current and future generations of the Minangkabau people.

Plot 
Long ago, there lived a boy named Malin Kundang. He lived with his mother in a fishing village on a beach near Padang. Malin grew up to be an intelligent teen and was greatly loved by his mother. However, they both lived in a life of poverty as fishing was their only source of income. He dreamed of venturing out of the village in hopes of finding a better life. One day, Malin noticed a ship that was anchored in the beach's pier. He saw this as an opportunity and begged his mother to let him go to the city. However, his mother was reluctant as she feared of anything that might happen to him. Eventually, she finally agreed and told him to remember her and return to the village. She gave him packs of rice for food and said her goodbyes as he boars the ship and departs from the village.

Every morning, she stands at the edge of the pier and stares at the ocean as she waits for her son's return. She prayed for months for his safety and return back home. Several years has passed and she never heard from him. However, she always anticipated his arrival. One day, a luxurious and extravagant-looking ship arrived at the pier of the beach. The villagers gathered in the pier with curiosity as to who it might be. A man and a woman dressed in lavish, extravagant clothes disembarked from the ship. Seeing that it is her long lost son, she immediately went to him and hugged him tight. Instead of accepting her embrace, he forcefully pried loose of the hug and pushed her to the ground. He felt ashamed of his mother's ragged and scruffy clothes. As a result, he refused to acknowledge her as his mother in front of his wife, who looked down on her appearance. The couple went back to the ship and sailed away. 

The heartbroken mother prayed for the man's actions to be forgiven if he wasn't her son and prayed for God's justice if he was. Shortly after, the weather shifted drastically and a storm engulfed the sky. A thunderous bolt of lightning struck Malin's ship, destroying it to mere fragments. The aftermath of the wreckage of the ship was seen scattered throughout the beach the morning after. Amidst the pieces of the ship laid a human-shaped boulder that was believed to be Malin Kundang in a kneeling position. He was cursed and turned into a stone as a result of his behavior towards his mother.

The folktale conveys a moral lesson, emphasizing the importance of respect and gratitude towards one's parents. Despite all the struggles that he and his mother overcame and her selfless acts of kindness towards him, Malin chose to deny his humble origins and, thus, had to reap the consequences.

The Stone of Malin Kundang

The story of Malin Kundang's stone in the folktale inspired the creation of the rock formation known as Batu Malin Kundang. The stone is an artificial relief that was created in the 1980s by Dasril Bayras and Ibenzani Usman. The relief is located in a beach near Padang called Air Manis (Sweet Water) Beach. It is placed on the same beach that was referenced in the story. The creation of Batu Malin Kundang and its association with the folktale popularized the Air Manis Beach, making it a popular tourist attraction in Padang. 

Similar to the story, the stone depicts Malin Kundang in a kneeling position, illustrating him begging for forgiveness. Aside from Malin Kundang's stone, there are several artificial rock formations near the stone that is shaped to represent fragments and wreckage of the ship.

Variations

Brunei
In Brunei, the local variant of the story is called Nakhoda Manis and is associated with a prow-like rock, Jong Batu, in the Brunei River.

Malaysia and Singapore
In Malaysia and Singapore, the story is known as Si Tenggang or Si Tanggang’’ One particularly unique Malaysian variant is Cerita Megat Sajobang in which the main character, Tenggang or Tanggang, refuses to receive his loincloth-wearing parents who then curse his ship which turns into a stone hill, the site is now known as Batu Caves.

Popular culture
As a parable on family responsibility, the story is popular in Southeast Asia as a theme for animations, film, drama and literature even until today.
 Si Tanggang, a 1961 black and white Malay film.
 Malin Kundang (film), a 1971 Indonesian film.
 The Travel Journals of Si Tenggang II, a 1979 autobiographic, produced by Malaysian laureate Muhammad Haji Salleh, uses the story as a metaphor for the general experience of moving away from one's cultural roots.
Si Tanggang (Astro), 2009 Malaysian documentary chronicling the origins of the legend produced by Astro.

See also

Culture of Indonesia
Parental respect

References

External links
Malin Kundang from Folklore Indonesia
Nakoda Manis ASEAN Stories Project (story and photos of Jong Batu)

Minangkabau folklore
Asian mythology
Southeast Asian mythology

ms:Si Tanggang